The Danube Legion (or the Rhine Legion - ) was a unit of Poles in the service of Napoleonic France. It was also known as the 3rd Polish Legion.

Origin
It was formed on 8 September 1799 in the Batavian Republic from Polish volunteers, mostly French prisoners of war from the Austrian Army. Numbering about 6,000 the legion was commanded by general Karol Kniaziewicz.

The legion fought at the Battle of Marengo and Battle of Hohenlinden. However during treaty negotiations between the French and the Austrians, the French were finding the Polish issue to be a problem; the Poles wanted the French to continue fighting against the partitioners of Poland; the future Polish national anthem, Mazurek Dąbrowskiego, created by Józef Wybicki, promised 'the return of the Polish army from Italy to Poland'. Instead, the French used Polish troops to quell down uprisings in conquered territories, which led to much unrest amongst the Polish troops. The prospect of being assigned to Louis I of Etruria, Napoleons appointee as the King of Etruria did not sit well with their republican sympathies. As the King also felt reluctant to take financial responsibility for them, Napoleon reassigned them to quell the Haitian Revolution which was currently giving him problems. General Jan Henryk Dąbrowski initially complained from his headquarters in Milan, but subsequently acquiesced. After Stanisław Fiszer had turned down the command in favour of returning to Poland, Fortunat Bernard, a Frenchman, was appointed. After a storm had thwarted an initial attempt to depart, the 3rd Polish Demibrigade left Livorno on May 17, 1802, reaching Cadiz by July 11. It was here that Bernard applied to the French government that the demibridae be reassigned as a French demibrigade of the line. The fleet set sail again on July 24, and it was only at this stage that many of the Poles were informed that they were bound for Haiti.

113th Demibrigade of the Line
On 4 September 1802, two days after arriving in Cap Francais, Haiti, Louis-Alexandre Berthier, the French War Minister redesignated the 3rd Polish Demibriagde as the 113th Demibrigade. However news of this change of name did not reach Haiti until November, by which time the demibrigade had suffered major casualties. Eventually combat casualties and tropical diseases (like the yellow fever) reduced the 5,280 strong Legion to a few hundred survivors in the space of less than two years. By the time French forces retreated from the island in 1803 about 4,000 Poles were dead (either from disease or combat), a few hundred chose to switch sides and remain on the island.

1st Battalion
The 1st Battalion was commanded by Wodzinski and joined the French Northern Division led by General Jean Boudet, but soon to be replaced by General Bertrand Clausel. Upon arrival on September 2 Charles Leclerc reckoned their strength as 984. By the end of November they were estimated to be 80 men who were then attached to the 74th French Demibridage of the Line. By September 23, 1803, French military records state that only 6 officers and 14 men were still alive.

2nd Battalion
The 2nd Battalion was commanded by Wojciech Bolesta and was assigned to Jean-Jacques Dessalines mixed division. It comprised eight regular companies plus accompany of grenadiers consisting of 775 men in all.

3rd Battalion
The 3rd Battalion were commanded by Frannciszek Grabski. They were assigned to the Right Northern Division commanded by General Jean Baptiste Brunet. Of the original 21 officers and 768 soldiers only 634 men joined Brunet's division, the remainder being in hospital. The 3rd Company was under the command of Captain Sangowski, who understood little French. He unwisely led  them into an exposed position at Dubrail, an unfortified plantation where they were attacked by rebels. After running out of ammunition they surrendered, only to find that the rebels started massacring them. However Navarrez led some troops of the 86th Demibrigade to their rescue, by which time only four were still alive, a total of thirty five having been killed. Sangowski, who had escaped by hiding in a swamp late died of pneumonia, thus avoiding court-martial.

References

Polish Legions (Napoleonic period)
Military units and formations established in 1799
Military units and formations disestablished in 1803
French military units and formations of the Napoleonic Wars
Military history of Poland
Regiments of the French First Republic